Henri Marteau (31 March 1874 – 3 October 1934) was a French violinist and composer, who obtained Swedish citizenship in 1915.

Life and career
Marteau was born in Reims. He was of German and French ancestry. His father, a Frenchman, was a well known amateur violinist in Reims, and took a great interest in musical affairs. His mother, a Berliner, was an excellent pianist, who had studied under Clara Schumann. Through the influence of Camillo Sivori, Marteau's parents were easily persuaded to allow their son to adopt a musical career, and he showed remarkable aptitude in his studies, first under Bunzl, later under Hubert Léonard and from 1891 entered Jules Garcin's class at the Conservatoire de Paris.

Marteau was remarkable both for his individuality and for his development. His debut was made when only ten years old, at a concert given by the Vienna Philharmonic Society, conducted by Hans Richter. A tour through Switzerland and Germany followed. A year later Charles Gounod selected this young violinist to play the obbligato of a piece, Vision de Jeanne d'Arc, composed for the Joan of Arc Centenary Celebration at Reims, where he also performed, before an audience of 2500 people, his teacher Léonard's Violin Concerto No. 5.

Marteau made his professional debut in London in 1888, at a Richter concert. In 1892 he gained the first place prize at the Conservatoire de Paris, and Jules Massenet and Théodore Dubois both wrote a violin concerto especially for his benefit. A further series of tours followed. Twice he visited America, once in 1893, and once in 1898, and he visited Russia 1897-1899.

He was then engaged in teaching, and for a time was professor of the violin at Geneva Conservatoire. On the death of Joseph Joachim in 1907, Marteau was called to the Berlin University of the Arts, where he became head of the violin department. During World War I he was expelled from Germany. The Germans accused him of being a French spy, while the French accused him of being a German spy, so he had to avoid both countries. Instead he moved to Sweden, where he became a citizen in 1915.

Marteau was long an advocate of chamber music. On 13 April 1894, for example, he, pianist Ami Lauchame, a violist named Koert, and a cellist named Hegner were reported to have given their second invitation chamber music concert in New York, performing works of Camille Saint-Saëns and Gabriel Fauré; a third concert was scheduled for the following week. By 1906, Marteau was leading a string quartet that broke up in a dispute over a work by Max Reger. In Berlin, he formed another string quartet with his student Licco Amar as second violinist and Hugo Becker as cellist; later, Becker's student George Georgescu would take over the cello position.

Marteau composed a cantata for soprano, chorus and orchestra, entitled La voix de Jeanne d'Arc.

He died in Lichtenberg, Bavaria at the age of 60.

In order to revitalize the name and works of Marteau, the Hofer Symphoniker organize the International Violin Competition Henri Marteau. The event takes place every three years at Marteau house in Lichtenberg and at the Freiheitshalle in Hof, Bavaria.

Selected works
Stage
 Meister Schwalbe, Musical Comedy in 1 act (1922)

Concertante
 Andante for violin and orchestra (1891)
 Fantaisie in E major for violin and orchestra, Op. 3
 Cadenza for the Violin Concerto in D Major, Op. 77 by Johannes Brahms (1904)
 Concerto in B major for cello and orchestra, Op. 7 (1905)
 Suite in A major for violin and orchestra, Op. 15
 Concerto in C major for violin and orchestra, Op. 18 (1919)

Chamber music
 Berceuse for violin and piano, Op. 1 (1902)
 Berceuse for violin and piano, Op. 2 No. 1
 Feuillet d'Album in D minor for viola and piano, Op. 2 No. 2
 Andantino in A minor for violin and piano, Op. 2 No. 3
 String Quartet No.1 in D major, Op. 5
 Chaconne in C minor for viola and piano, Op. 8 (1905)
 String Quartet No.2 in D major, Op. 9 (1905)
 Trio in F minor for violin, viola and cello, Op. 12 (1907)
 Quintet in C minor for clarinet and string quartet, Op. 13 (1908)
 Études d'archet (Bowing Studies) for violin with violin accompaniment, Op. 14 (1910)
 String Quartet No.3 in C major, Op. 17 (1921)
 Études de gammes (Scale Studies) for violin, Op. 19 (1916)
 Sérénade for 2 flutes, 2 oboes, 2 clarinets, bass clarinet and 2 bassoons, Op. 20 (1922)
 24 Caprices d'execution transcendante for violin and piano, Op. 25 (1919)
 Fantaisie for organ and violin, Op. 27 (1910)
 Terzetto for flute, violin and viola, Op. 32 (1924)
 Sonata Fantastica for violin solo, Op. 35 (1927)
 Partita for flute and viola, Op. 42 No. 2
 Divertimento for flute and violin, Op. 43 No. 1

Keyboard
 Trois Compositions for organ, Op. 23 (1918)

Vocal
 Ave Maria for voice, violin, harp (piano) and organ (harmonium), Op. 4 No. 1
 8 Songs for voice and string quartet, Op. 10 (1906)
 Huit mélodies, Op.19c 1. "Pluie" ("Il pleut. J'entends le bruit égal des eaux" Victor Hugo), 2. "À Douarnenez en Bretagne" ("On respire du sel dans l'air" Sully Prudhomme), 3. "Ritournelle" ("Dans la plaine blonde et sous les allées" François Coppée) 4. "Matin d'octobre" ("C'est l'heure exquise et matinale" Coppée) 5. "Chanson de mer" ("Ton sourire infini m'est cher" Sully Prudhomme) 6. "Vitrail" ("Sur un fond d'or pâli, les saints rouges et bleus" Coppée)  7. "Pitié des choses"  (Coppée) 8. "Dans la rue, le soir" ("Neuf heures. On entend la retraite aux tambours." Coppée)
 Acht Gesänge, Op.28  1. "Stille Fahrt" ("Ich stand an einem dunklen Meer" :de:Hans Benzmann) 2 "Die Eichbäume" ("Aus den Gärten komm' ich zu euch, ihr Söhne des Berges!" Friedrich Hölderlin, 3. "Abendlied" ("Die Nacht ist niedergangen" Otto Bierbaum), 4. "Empor!" ("Nun breite stolze Schwingen aus" :de:Adolf Holst), 5. "Gipfelndes Glück" ("Ein Duft weht überall" Carmen Sylva) 6. "Regenlied" ("Walle, Regen, walle nieder" Klaus Groth) 7. "Hütet Euch" ("Wo am Herd ein Brautpaar siedelt" Emanuel Geibel), 8. "Liebesnacht" ("O weile, süßer Geliebter! Martin Greif)
 Drei geistliche Gesänge (Three Sacred Songs) for medium voice and organ, Op. 29 (1923) 
 Fünf Schilflieder for baritone, viola and piano, Op. 31; words by Nikolaus Lenau 1. "Drüben geht die Sonne scheiden" 2. "Trübe wird's, die Wolken jagen" 3.  "Auf geheimem Waldespfade" 4. "Sonnenuntergang; Schwarze Wolken zieh'n" 5. "Auf dem Teich, dem Regungslosen"
 2 Ballades for voice and piano, Op. 34 (1924)

Choral
 Drei Lieder (Three Songs) for mixed chorus, Op. 33 (1924)
 La voix de Jeanne d'Arc, Cantata for soprano, chorus and orchestra

Sources
 Sadie, S. (ed.) (1980) The New Grove Dictionary of Music & Musicians, [vol. # 11].
The Memoirs of Carl Flesch 1957
An Encyclopedia of the Violin - Alberto Bachmann 1875
Violin Virtuosos - Henry Roth 1997

CD Releases
 Henri Marteau: Concerto in C major for violin and orchestra, Op. 18 and Serenade Op. 20 - Nicolas Koeckert and the Deutsche Radio Philharmonie Saarbrücken Kaiserslautern (Solo Musica SM 299)
 Henri Marteau: Huit mélodies, Op. 19c and Op. 28 - Vesselina Kasarova and Fünf Schilflieder for baritone, viola and piano, Op. 31 - Dietrich Fischer-Dieskau (Solo Musica SM 263)
 Henri Marteau: Quintet in C minor for clarinet and string quartet, Op. 13 and Serenade, Op. 20 - Mark Lieb and the Phoenix Ensemble (with Alexander v. Zemlinsky's Trio, Op 3) (Navona Records NV 6076), Feb. 2017
 Henri Marteau: Quintet in C minor for clarinet and string quartet, Op. 13 - Praetorius Quartett and String Quartet No.2 in D major, Op. 9 - Marteau Quartett (Solo Musica SM 282)
 Henri Marteau: Discovery of a Romanticist (Solo Musica SM 229)
 Henri Marteau: string quartets, Vol. 1 - Isasi Quartet (CPO 555 128-2)

External links
  Henri Marteau website
 
 Website of the International Violin Competition Henri Marteau

References

1874 births
1934 deaths
Musicians from Reims
French classical composers
French male classical composers
19th-century French male classical violinists
French emigrants to Sweden
Swedish classical violinists